Montigny-lès-Vesoul (literally Montigny near Vesoul) is a commune in the Haute-Saône department in the region of Bourgogne-Franche-Comté in eastern France. The Abbey of Montigny-lès-Vesoul was founded in 1286, and completely rebuilt in the 18th century. It was closed and sold at the French Revolution, and has been a listed monument since 1997.

Gallery

See also
Communes of the Haute-Saône department

References

Communes of Haute-Saône